|}

The Prix des Chênes is a Group 3 flat horse race in France open to two-year-old thoroughbred colts and geldings. It is run at Longchamp over a distance of 1,600 metres (about 1 mile), and it is scheduled to take place each year in September.

History
The event was originally open to two-year-olds of either gender. It was established in 1882, and was contested over 1,600 metres at Longchamp.

The race was abandoned during World War I, with no running from 1914 to 1919.

Due to World War II, the Prix des Chênes was cancelled in 1939 and 1940. It was held at Le Tremblay in 1943, and was cancelled again in 1944.

The race was cut to 1,400 metres in 1964. It reverted to 1,600 metres in 1966.

The Prix des Chênes left Longchamp after 1988. For brief spells it was staged at Saint-Cloud (1989–90, 1994), Évry (1991–93) and Chantilly (1995). It returned to Longchamp and was closed to fillies in 1996.

The race formerly served as a trial for the Grand Critérium. It is now more usually a trial for the Critérium International.

Records
Leading jockey (5 wins):
 Frank O'Neill – Mongolie (1911), Pirpiriol (1912), Phusla (1920), Saint Hubert (1922), Cadum (1923)
 Charles Semblat – Lucide (1924), Becassine (1925), Verdi (1928), Cassandre (1930), Vaucouleurs (1931)
 Yves Saint-Martin – Taraval (1963), Bord a Bord (1964), Stanleyville (1972), Captive Island (1984), Splendid Moment (1985)

Leading trainer (10 wins):
 André Fabre – Along All (1988), Manninamix (1995), Grazalema (1998), Equerry (2000), Shaanmer (2001), Carlotamix (2005), French Navy (2010), Cloth of Stars (2015), Akihiro (2016), Ancient Rome (2021)

Leading owner (6 wins):
 Édouard de Rothschild – Vertumne (1902), Cadum (1923), Bubbles (1927), Godiche (1929), Gonfalonier (1936), Irifle (1938)

Winners since 1978

Earlier winners

 1882: Parthenope
 1883: Carmelite
 1884: Maman Berthe
 1885:
 1886: Concordia
 1887: Fumiste
 1888: Tire-Larigot
 1889: Master Gillam
 1890: Espion
 1891: Incitatus
 1892: Argenteuil
 1893: Chartreuse
 1894: Le Justicier
 1895: Epicharis
 1896:
 1897: Infant
 1898: Maurice
 1899: Love Grass
 1900: Saint Armel
 1901: Montgaillard
 1902: Vertumne
 1903: Feuille de Chou
 1904: Finasseur
 1905: Moulins la Marche
 1906: Imperia
 1907: Quintette
 1908: Kumamoto
 1909: Soleil
 1910: Faucheur
 1911: Mongolie
 1912: Pirpiriol
 1913: Oued
 1914–19: no race
 1920: Phusla
 1921: Syntheme
 1922: Saint Hubert
 1923: Cadum
 1924: Lucide
 1925: Becassine
 1926: La Desirade
 1927: Bubbles
 1928: Verdi
 1929: Godiche
 1930: Cassandre
 1931: Vaucouleurs
 1932: Pantalon
 1933: Denver
 1934: Ping Pong
 1935: Don Milo
 1936: Gonfalonier
 1937: Love Secret
 1938: Irifle
 1939–40: no race
 1941: My Drake / Tartarin *
 1942: Micipsa
 1943: Vole Vite
 1944: no race
 1945: Fasano
 1946:
 1947:
 1948: Fontenay
 1949: Eppi d'Or
 1950: Lavarede
 1951: Galeace
 1952: Corioline
 1953: Alba Nox
 1954: Fersen
 1955:
 1956: Mourne
 1957: Arsar
 1958: Tiepoletto
 1959: Tanata
 1960: Misti
 1961: Tracy
 1962: Beautiful
 1963: Taraval
 1964: Bord a Bord
 1965: Behistoun
 1966: Frontal
 1967: Verglas
 1968: Tuxpan
 1969: Experio
 1970: Maraschino
 1971: Banaldo
 1972: Stanleyville
 1973: Bayraan
 1974: Mariacci
 1975: French Swanee

* The 1941 race was a dead-heat and has joint winners.

See also
 List of French flat horse races

References
 France Galop / Racing Post:

 france-galop.com – A Brief History: Prix des Chênes.
 galopp-sieger.de – Prix des Chênes.
 horseracingintfed.com – International Federation of Horseracing Authorities – Prix des Chênes (2016).
 pedigreequery.com – Prix des Chênes – Longchamp.

Flat horse races for two-year-olds
Longchamp Racecourse
Horse races in France
Recurring sporting events established in 1882